Dávid Gallovič (born 23 April 1996) is a Slovak footballer who plays for FC Košice in the Slovak 2. liga as a midfielder.

Club career

FK Senica
Gallovič made his Fortuna Liga debut for Senica against Dunajská Streda on 20 September 2020. Gallovič came on as a second half replacement for Edmund Addo in the second half fixture, with the score at 1:3. During Gallovič's stay, Senica narrowed the gap through former league top-scorer Tomáš Malec but soon after, DAC regained the two goal gap and set the final score at 2:4 through Eric Ramírez.

References

External links
 FK Senica official club profile 
 Futbalnet profile 
 
 

1996 births
Living people
Sportspeople from Poprad
Slovak footballers
Association football midfielders
FK Poprad players
FK Senica players
FC Košice (2018) players
2. Liga (Slovakia) players
Slovak Super Liga players